Aji Chay Rural District is in the Central District of Tabriz County, East Azerbaijan province, Iran. At the National Census of 2006, its population was 33,818 in 7,942 households. There were 42,460 inhabitants in 11,642 households at the following census of 2011. At the most recent census of 2016, the population of the rural district was 46,054 in 13,752 households. The largest of its 12 villages was Bagh-e Maruf, with 12,068 people.

References 

Tabriz County

Rural Districts of East Azerbaijan Province

Populated places in East Azerbaijan Province

Populated places in Tabriz County